Diana Chalá Zamora (born May 20, 1982) is a female judoka from Ecuador, who won the bronze medal in the women's middleweight division (– 70 kg) at the 2003 Pan American Games in Santo Domingo, alongside Dulce Piña of the Dominican Republic.

References

External links
 

1982 births
Living people
Ecuadorian female judoka
Judoka at the 2003 Pan American Games
Judoka at the 2011 Pan American Games
Pan American Games bronze medalists for Ecuador
Pan American Games medalists in judo
Judoka at the 2015 Pan American Games
South American Games silver medalists for Ecuador
South American Games medalists in judo
Competitors at the 2002 South American Games
Competitors at the 2006 South American Games
Medalists at the 2003 Pan American Games
21st-century Ecuadorian women